United Nations Security Council Resolution 2593 was adopted on 30 August 2021,  following the Fall of Kabul and subsequent Taliban takeover in Afghanistan. According to the resolution, the Security Council demands that Afghan territory not be used to threaten or attack any other country or to shelter and train terrorists.

Voting summary 

 France, the United Kingdom, the United States, Estonia, India, Ireland, Kenya, Mexico, Niger, Norway, St. Vincent-Grenadines, Tunisia and Vietnam voted for.
 Russia and China abstained from the vote.

See also

War in Afghanistan
 List of United Nations Security Council Resolutions 2501 to 2600 (2019–2021)

References

External links
Text of the Resolution at undocs.org

 2593
August 2021 events
2021 in Afghanistan
 2593